"The Gift" is a song co-written and performed by American recording artist Jim Brickman, featuring singer Collin Raye and Susan Ashton. It was released in 1997 on Windham Hill Records as the first single and as well as the thirteenth track from his fourth studio album of the same name. It is a country pop song that was written by Jim Brickman and Tom Douglas. This song is often played on radio around the time of Christmas due to being part of Brickman's holiday album of the same name.

Charts

Weekly charts

Year-end charts

Cover version
The song became a cover version for Piolo Pascual performing The Gift from the movie Milan.
In September 25, 2022, Asia's Popstar Royalty Sarah Geronimo and her husband Matteo Guidicelli did a special cover of the 1997 country pop hit on ASAP Natin' To with Jim Brickman himself.

References

External links
 
 
 
 

1990s ballads
1997 singles
1997 songs
Jim Brickman songs
Collin Raye songs
Susan Ashton songs
Songs written by Jim Brickman
Songs written by Tom Douglas (songwriter)
Country ballads
Pop ballads
American Christmas songs